"No Way to Prevent This', Says Only Nation Where This Regularly Happens" is the title of a series of articles perennially published by the American news satire organization The Onion satirizing the frequency of mass shootings in the United States and the lack of action taken in the wake of such incidents.

Each article is about 200 words long, detailing the location of the shooting and the number of victims, but otherwise remaining essentially the same. A fictitious resident—usually of a state in which the shooting did not take place—is quoted as saying that the shooting was "a terrible tragedy", but "there's nothing anyone can do to stop them." The article ends by pointing out that the United States is the "only economically advanced nation in the world where roughly two mass shootings have occurred every month for the past eight years," and that Americans view themselves and the situation as "helpless".

Background 
The article was first published on May 27, 2014, following the Isla Vista killings. Since then, The Onion has republished the same article an additional 30 times , nearly verbatim, with only minor changes to reflect the specifics of each shooting. In 2017, Marnie Shure, the managing editor for The Onion, said: "By re-running the same commentary it strengthens the original commentary tenfold each time. ... In the wake of these really terrible things, we have this comment that really holds up."

After The Onion republished the article on February 14, 2018, following the Stoneman Douglas High School shooting, Jason Roeder, the writer of the original 2014 article, wrote that he "had no idea it would be applied to the high school a mile from [his] house". On May 25, 2022, following the Robb Elementary School shooting, The Onion featured all 21 versions of the article they had written since 2014 on the home page of their website and on their Twitter feed. The homepage feature was repeated following the July 4 Highland Park shooting, the article count having increased to 25.

List 
, The Onion has published the article 31 times, each in response to a mass shooting in the United States.

Reception 
The New York Times wrote in 2017 that "each time The Onion publishes this particular headline, it seems to rocket around the internet with more force", and that the headline, "with each use, seemed to turn from cheeky political commentary on gun control into a reverberation of despair". Mashable wrote that "[n]othing captures that feeling of frustration and powerlessness" following major mass shootings as well as these Onion articles, adding that "[t]here's no shortage of brilliant Onion pieces, but none have resonated—or been as tragically prescient—like the "No Way" post." The Washington Post wrote that, with these articles, The Onion "appears to capture the frustration and futility felt by so many people" following mass shootings, noting the increased Internet traffic the articles draw and how popular they are on social media. The Huffington Post cited these articles as "some of the most resonant commentary on the nation's total lack of action on gun violence", going on to say that they have become "a staple of the social media response to mass shootings", citing how widely shared they are on Facebook and Twitter. The Daily Beast mentioned the articles in a piece titled "How The Onion Became One of the Strongest Voices for Gun Control". Similarly, Wired mentioned it in an article discussing the power of The Onion satire in the face of gun violence, titled "Only The Onion Can Save Us Now".

See also 
 "Heartbreaking: The Worst Person You Know Just Made A Great Point"

Notes

References

Bibliography 

2014 establishments in the United States
2014 in Internet culture
2014 works
Recurring events established in 2014
The Onion
Gun violence in the United States
Headlines